The Death of a Dictionary is the debut album by alternative rock band Public Affection. An EP titled Divided Mind, Divided Planet followed before the band changed their name to Live.

History
The album was released in June 1989, when the band members graduated from high school, via their own label, Action Front Records. Just 1,000 copies of the album were made, all on cassette, and it is long out of print. The track "Good Pain" was eventually reworked for inclusion on the first Live EP, Four Songs, and their debut album Mental Jewelry. Aside from "Good Pain", the remainder of the songs are still only officially available on this cassette, although the album is widely available on the internet via download.

Track listing

Personnel
 Ed Kowalczyk (credited as "Zedd" on the cassette's inlay) – lead vocals, rhythm guitar
 Chad Taylor – lead guitar, backing vocals
 Patrick Dahlheimer – bass
 Chad Gracey – drums

References

1989 debut albums
Live (band) albums
Self-released albums